George Hekkers (1923-2008) was a player in the National Football League for the Detroit Lions, and the Baltimore Colts from 1947 to 1949 as a tackle. Previously, he played with the Miami Seahawks of the All-America Football Conference in 1946. He played at the collegiate level for the University of Wisconsin–Madison.

Biography
Hekkers was born George James Hekkers on February 18, 1923, in Milwaukee, Wisconsin. After school went on to be a bomber pilot in the U.S. Air Force in world war 2. After returning from war he moved to Burbank California with his wife Marvel Lien. He worked for years as a stage hand in local 33 and was the unions business agent for a number of years. His favorite family member was Dean G Hekkers Jr and spent hours with his beloved grandson in the garage teaching him how to build. George died on February 6, 2008.

See also
List of Detroit Lions players

References

1923 births
2008 deaths
Baltimore Colts (1947–1950) players
Detroit Lions players
Miami Seahawks players
Wisconsin Badgers football players
Players of American football from Milwaukee